Ejner Jensen (6 October 1929 – 17 December 2020) was a Danish footballer. He played in one match for the Denmark national football team in 1955.

References

External links
 

1929 births
2020 deaths
Danish men's footballers
Denmark international footballers
Place of birth missing
Association footballers not categorized by position